Golden fantasy is a secret (or not-so-secret) expectation that all of one's problems can be solved by interaction with a perfect and all-caring relationship figure. The fantasy can be found both in psychotherapy and in ordinary life.

Structure
The golden fantasy was first named as such by Sidney Smith in 1977.  Arguably however, the concept had been anticipated by Karen Horney and by Charles Brenner; and it was rooted in earlier psychoanalytic understanding of passive-receptive mastery.   

Such a fantasy may resonate to unfortunate effect with the therapist's own "rescuer" fantasies; and has to be gradually given up and mourned if progress in therapy is to be made. In the form of compulsive acting out of the fantasy in real life, it can constitute a formidable obstacle to analysis of the transference.

Later writers have placed more emphasis on the adaptive nature of the fantasy in ego-maintenance – its role in fending off a primitive sense of angst – and on the necessity of its sensitive handling, to strengthen the therapeutic alliance.

Residential care workers see the fantasy emerging in split form, with carers first seen as fulfilling it in entirety, in opposition to the bad parents; and then the parents being seen as the answer to the golden fantasy, with the care home becoming all bad.

Cultural examples
Sylvia Plath has been seen as seeking an idealised fantasy partner, able to give her a missing sense of fullness, completeness and perfection.

See also

References

Further reading
Sidney Smith (1977), "The golden fantasy: a regressive reaction to separation anxiety", International Journal of Psychoanalysis, 58, 311–324

Defence mechanisms
Personal development
Interpersonal communication
Interpersonal relationships
Abnormal psychology